138–142 Portland Street is a historic commercial building located at the address of the same name in Boston, Massachusetts.

Description and history 
The five-story, Beaux Arts style building was designed by Stephen Codman and built in 1896. The first floor has modern storefronts; the next three levels have brick pilasters separating the window bays with cast stone architraves. A cornice line separates the fifth level from the lower ones, and has oxeye windows at the building's rounded corners, and a dentillated cornice. It has also been classified as a Classical Revival building.

The building was listed on the National Register of Historic Places on September 5, 1985, and included in the Bulfinch Triangle Historic District on February 27, 1986.

See also
 National Register of Historic Places listings in northern Boston, Massachusetts

References

Commercial buildings completed in 1896
Commercial buildings on the National Register of Historic Places in Massachusetts
Office buildings in Boston
National Register of Historic Places in Boston
Historic district contributing properties in Massachusetts